George Edward Dobson FRS FLS FZS (4 September 1848 at Edgeworthstown, County Longford, Ireland – 26 November 1895) was an Irish zoologist, photographer and army surgeon. He took a special interest in bats, describing many new species, and some species have been named after him.

Biography
Dobson was the eldest son of Parke Dobson   and was educated at the Royal School Enniskillen and then at Trinity College, Dublin. He gained the degrees of Bachelor of Arts in 1866, Bachelor of Medicine, Bachelor of Surgery and  Master of Surgery in 1867 and Master of Arts in 1875.

He became an army surgeon after 1867 serving in India and rose to the position of surgeon major. In 1868 he visited the Andaman Islands, collecting zoological specimens for the Indian Museum along with Wood-Mason, and in May 1872 he made ethnological and photographic studies of the Andamanese peoples.

Around 1878, he became curator of the Royal Victoria Museum at Netley.

Achievements
Dobson was an expert on small mammals, especially bats ( the Chiroptera) and Insectivora. He was a member of several scientific societies, the Royal Society (elected 1883), the Linnean Society of London and the Zoological Society of London. He was a corresponding member of the Academy of Natural Sciences of Philadelphia and of the Biological Society of Washington.

Works
Catalogue of the Chiroptera in Collection of British Museum (1878)
 Monograph of the Asiatic Chiroptera (1876) 
A Monograph of the Insectivora, systematic and anatomical (three parts, John Van Voorst, Londres, 1882-1890.

In addition Dobson also contributed to the ninth edition of the Encyclopædia Britannica where he wrote the accounts about the vampyre bats, the moles and the shrews.

References

External links

Chrono-Biographical Sketches Dobson, George Edward (Ireland 1848-1895)

Irish zoologists
Taxonomists
1848 births
1895 deaths
Irish entomologists
Fellows of the Linnean Society of London
Fellows of the Royal Society
Fellows of the Zoological Society of London
People from County Longford
Alumni of Trinity College Dublin
19th-century British zoologists
19th-century Irish scientists